The Mesa Arizona Temple (formerly the Arizona Temple; nicknamed the Lamanite Temple) is the seventh operating temple of the Church of Jesus Christ of Latter-day Saints (LDS Church).  Located in the city of Mesa, Arizona, it is the first of six LDS temples built or planned in the state.

History
The LDS temple in Mesa was one of the first to be constructed by the church.  Similar to the Cardston Alberta Temple, the church decided to hold a competition for the design of the temple with the exception of only inviting three Salt Lake firms to participate.  The winning design was proposed by Don Carlos Young Jr. and Ramm Hansen. Announced in 1919, only seven years after Arizona had achieved statehood, it was one of 3 temples announced and constructed to serve outlying Latter-day Saint settlements in the early part of the century, the others being constructed in Laie, Hawaii and Cardston, Alberta. While none of the three settlements were particularly large in their own right, they were considered thriving centers of largely Latter-day Saint populations.  The long and arduous trip to existing temples located in the state of Utah would prove costly and even dangerous for the faithful of the era, and temple attendance was (and is) an important part of the faith. As such, it was seen as necessary to construct temples in these communities.

Numerous colonies had been set up in Arizona by the church during the last half of the nineteenth century, and plans had been discussed for a temple in the area as early as 1908, but the start of World War I stopped these for a while. The plan to build a temple in Mesa, Arizona was finally announced on October 3, 1919 and a  site was selected and bought in 1921. The site was dedicated shortly after on November 28, 1921 and on April 25, 1922 the groundbreaking ceremony took place. Heber J. Grant conducted the ceremony.

Following the earlier traditions set forth in the building of temples, such as the Salt Lake Temple, the new structure in Mesa was a centerpiece of an organized and planned community for the faithful that lived nearby.  Upon its completion in 1927 it was the third largest temple in use by the church and the largest outside of Utah, and remains among the largest temples constructed to this day.

In a departure from the style of temples constructed prior, the Mesa temple (along with the temples in Laie and Cardston) was built in a neoclassical style suggestive of the Temple in Jerusalem, lacking the spires that have become a mainstay of temples built since then, and prior to the announcement and impending construction of the Paris France Temple it was the last LDS temple constructed without a spire. The temple is a neoclassical design featuring the primary structure atop a pedestal, a frieze, pilasters with Corinthian capitals (12 pair along the long side and 10 pair along the short side) and amphorae on fluted columns on the grounds.  Below the cornice, eight frieze panels (carved in low relief) depict the gathering of God's people from the Old and New World, and the Pacific Islands to America.

When construction was finished on the temple, the public was able to take tours through the temple. Two hundred thousand people were able to take a tour through the Mesa Temple. The temple was dedicated on October 23, 1927 by Heber J. Grant. By that afternoon, the temple was being put to use. In 1945, the temple was distinguished by becoming the first to offer temple ordinances in Spanish, the first time they were offered in a language other than English.

Renovations
The Mesa Temple was closed in February 1974, for extensive remodeling that equipped the ordinance rooms for motion-picture presentation of the endowment sessions, and that added a new entrance and an additional , providing larger dressing rooms and increasing the number of sealing rooms. Spencer W. Kimball re-dedicated the temple on April 16, 1975.

In May 2018, the temple closed for renovations and was rededicated by Dallin H. Oaks on December 12, 2021. Prior to the temple rededication, a public temple open house was held from October 16 to November 20, except for Sundays, with a youth devotional on December 11.

Public exhibits and events

History of the visitors' center 
Just north of the temple is a Visitors' Center. The original visitors' center was located near the west entrance of the temple in the late 1940s, which consisted of tables and literature racks. Across the street was the Bureau of Information and Genealogical Library. Due to inadequacies to meet demand, a new building was constructed and dedicated by David O. McKay on December 30, 1956. An expansion of the building was completed in 1981 to house new exhibits and was again remodeled in 2015.

New visitors' center 
As part of a larger plan to renovate the temple, the original visitors' center was demolished in 2018. A new 18,000 square foot visitors' center and interactive Family History Discovery Center were built.  The new visitors’ center is now open to public since its recent dedication by Ulisses Soares on August 12, 2021. It is located in the northwest side of the Mesa Temple, in the corner of Main Street and Lesueur. It includes a children’s play area, with interactive activities; a hang out room for teens; a community section, with displays explaining the city's diverse history and spiritual heritage built by Native Americans, Hispanic migrants and Mormon pioneers. There is also a coloring wall, an interactive justserve.org screen to locate local community service opportunities, a 3D scale model of the temple, and a display where visitors learn more about God and Jesus Christ. Other areas include teaching rooms with videos and individual reflection pods.  In addition, there is also a family research area with computer work stations and helpers where guests can work at their own pace researching, adding to their family history and connecting their family tree. The visitors' center also houses a replica of a statue of Jesus Christ by Danish artist Bertel Thorvaldsen called the Christus. The Visitors' Centers and grounds are staffed by church missionaries and the public is welcome to walk on the temple grounds and enjoy the gardens.

Christmas lights and pageant 
Since 1938, there is an annual Christmas lights display with a nativity scene during Christmas season, attracting more than 500,000 guests every year.  Began in 1938, the temple hosts the Mesa Arizona Easter Pageant, entitled Jesus the Christ, between late March and early April, which attracts more than 75,000 people annually and is the "largest annual outdoor Easter pageant in the world."

Presidents
Notable presidents of the temple include David K. Udall (1927–34); Junius E. Driggs (1975–80); and L. Kenyon Udall (1997–2000). The current president is Kenneth M Smith (2017–).

See also

 Comparison of temples of The Church of Jesus Christ of Latter-day Saints
 Torleif S. Knaphus - sculptor who created the eight friezes in the ornamental band around the tops of the north and south outside walls
 List of temples of The Church of Jesus Christ of Latter-day Saints
 List of temples of The Church of Jesus Christ of Latter-day Saints by geographic region
 Temple architecture (Latter-day Saints)
 The Church of Jesus Christ of Latter-day Saints in Arizona

Notes

References

External links

 Mesa Arizona Temple Official site
 Mesa Arizona Temple ChurchofJesusChristTemples.org
 Mesa Temple Christmas Lights

20th-century Latter Day Saint temples
Temple
Buildings designed to replicate Solomon's Temple
Temple
Churches completed in 1927
Temples (LDS Church) in Arizona
1927 establishments in Arizona